The Venetian regional election of 2015 took place in Veneto on 31 May 2015, as part of a big round of regional elections in Italy. Venetian voters elected their President and their Regional Council, whose members had been reduced to 51, including the President.

Luca Zaia, incumbent President (elected in 2010 with 60.2% of the vote) and leading member of the Northern League (LN), was re-elected by a reduced majority, due to a split occurred within his party in the run-up of the election, but, despite this, his victory over Alessandra Moretti of the Democratic Party (PD), who fared quite badly, was still a landslide: 50.1% to 22.7%. The election was a personal triumph for Zaia, who was the most voted President among the seven elected on 31 May. Other two candidates, Jacopo Berti of the Five Star Movement (M5S) and Flavio Tosi of the Tosi List for Veneto (LTV), the splinter group from the LN, got more than 10% of the vote and finished both at 11.9%. A fifth, Alessio Morosin of Venetian Independence (IV), and a sixth, Laura Coletti of the Communist Refoundation Party (PRC), won 2.5% and 0.9% of the vote, respectively.

Among the parties, the LN, which presented an official list and a list named after Zaia (however composed mainly of party members), improved its 2010's performance, by gaining 40.9% of the vote (combined result of the two lists, which obtained 17.8% and 23.1%, respectively). If the two LN-related lists are counted together, the PD came second with 16.7% of the vote (20.5% if Moretti's personal list is counted) and the M5S third with 10.4%. The combined score of the two lists connected to the LTV was 7.1%, while the once-mighty Forza Italia (heir of The People of Freedom and, before that, the original Forza Italia) stopped at 6.0%. 

The total score of Venetist and regional parties, a diverse field including the Liga Veneta, the LTV, Venetian Independence, Independence We Veneto, the North-East Union, Autonomous Veneto Project and Veneto Confederal State, was 54.3%, then a record.

Electoral system
The new electoral system of Veneto was regulated by the regional law 5/2012.
The assembly was made up of 50 councilors (including the candidate for president who came second), plus the president proclaimed elected.
After the elimination of the president's list, the distribution of seats remained proportional (with the D'Hondt method), but with a variable majority premium: the winning coalition is assigned 29 seats if it manages to exceed 50% of the preferences; 28 seats if he got between 40% and 50% of the votes; only 27 if it remained below 40%.
A 3% threshold was set for single lists or lists belonging to coalitions that did not exceed 5% of the votes.

Parties and candidates

Candidates
Luca Zaia (Veneto 2015), incumbent President and former minister of Agriculture;
Alessandra Moretti (Alessandra Moretti for President), former member of the Chamber of Deputies and MEP;
Jacopo Berti (Five Star Movement), entrepreneur and activist;
Flavio Tosi (Flavio Tosi for President), mayor of Verona and former regional minister of Health;
Alessio Morosin (Morosin for President), former regional councillor;
Laura Coletti (The Other Veneto), teacher and activist.

Coalitions and parties

Results

Council composition

Notes

Aftermath
Following the election, Luca Zaia formed his second government, composed of ten ministers, nine of Liga Veneta and one of Forza Italia.

References

Elections in Veneto
2015 elections in Italy
May 2015 events in Italy